The Aliened American was a newspaper in Cleveland, Ohio. It was the city's first black newspaper and is believed to have been the third newspaper for African Americans in the United States. Its first edition was published on April 9, 1853. William H. Day was the editor-in-residence and was assisted by Samuel Ringgold Ward, a former slave living in Toronto, and Rev. James W. C. Pennington of New York. Day moved to Buxton, Ontario in 1855. It was printed on a monthly basis for one more year as the People's Exposition.

In the first issue it was published that black Americans had been made into "aliens—through their Law, their Public Opinion and their Community-Regulations." A song of the same name is based upon the term "alien" to mean the descendants of enslaved people and Jefferson's concept of inalienable rights.

See also
 List of African-American newspapers in Ohio
 List of African-American newspapers and media outlets

References

African-American newspapers
Abolitionist newspapers published in the United States
Defunct newspapers published in Ohio
Newspapers published in Cleveland
African-American history in Cleveland
United States documents
Newspapers established in 1853
Publications disestablished in 1856
1853 establishments in Ohio
1856 disestablishments in Ohio